Fundamento may refer to:

 Fundamento de Esperanto, a book by L. L. Zamenhof
 Editora Fundamento, a Brazilian book publisher